"Second Chances" is the 150th episode of the American syndicated science fiction television series Star Trek: The Next Generation, the 24th episode of the sixth season. It was directed by series regular cast member LeVar Burton ("Geordi La Forge").  This episode has a cameo by Mae Carol Jemison, the first Black woman in space, who would become the first astronaut to guest star in a Star Trek series.

Set in the 24th century, the series follows the adventures of the Starfleet crew of the Federation starship Enterprise-D. In this episode, Commander Riker comes face to face with an exact duplicate of himself, created years earlier by a transporter phenomenon.

The episode aired in syndication on May 22, 1993.

Overview 

This episode features a cameo by the first African-American woman in space, Mae Carol Jemison, who was the first actual astronaut to appear on Star Trek. Nichelle Nichols (who played Nyota Uhura in The Original Series) was on set for the shoot. Jemison is a Star Trek fan and specifically cited Uhura as a role model for her and the reason she became an astronaut. She got the cameo after LeVar Burton (who played Geordi La Forge in the show) learned that she was a fan and asked her if she would like to guest star in an episode, and she agreed.

Jonathan Frakes plays both his main cast character William Riker and also a transporter duplication of himself from several years earlier.

The initial pitch for this episode was almost rejected until writers decided to use it to flesh out the backstory on Riker's previous relationship with Deanna Troi. 

The writers considered killing off the main Riker, and letting his alternate  take over, and  also considered killing off the alternate Riker. In the end they settled on letting both Rikers live.

This was the first episode of Star Trek to be directed by LeVar Burton and was Burton's directing debut. Burton went on to direct 28 episodes of Star Trek television in the following years, including Star Trek: Deep Space Nine, Star Trek: Voyager, and Star Trek: Enterprise. (The next episode Burton directed of TNG was "The Pegasus")

Plot
The Federation starship Enterprise is sent to the inhospitable planet Nervala IV to retrieve data from a Federation research base that was abandoned about eight years earlier due to the onset of a disruption field that prevented transporter use. Commander Riker is chosen to lead the team, having been part of the rescue team that helped evacuate the base; Riker notes that during that mission he was the last person beamed out to the Potemkin, where he was serving.

Using a break in the disruption field, the away team beams down and discovers a man who looks exactly like Riker. He says that he is Riker, and has been living alone on the base for eight years ever since the Potemkin was unable to transport him back aboard, under the assumption the Potemkin crew presumed him lost. He is a Starfleet Lieutenant, Senior Grade. This was Commander Riker's rank before he was promoted as a result of this mission.

Returning to the Enterprise, Dr. Crusher determines that this person is truly a second Riker; Chief Engineer La Forge postulates that years before, while Riker was beamed off the planet, the Potemkin had split the transporter beam to cut through the distortions, but one beam was reflected back to the base, so that Riker materialized in both places.

Cdr. Riker suggests that Lt. Riker join them on a second attempt to recover the data. At the base, their personality styles conflict, and the attempt ends in failure when Lt. Riker refuses to follow Cdr. Riker's orders.  Lt. Cdr. Data postulates that the two men are resentful towards each other due to the loss of their sense of uniqueness. Lt. Worf suggests another reason: each one sees in the other something of himself he does not like.

While helping plan a third attempt to recover the data, Lt. Riker tries to learn about what he has missed, and attempts to rekindle his previous relationship with Ship's Counselor Deanna Troi. Troi has come to accept that her relationship with Riker is no longer a romantic one, and is initially hesitant, but then considers it a second chance. They enjoy their time together; and Lt. Riker suggests leaving the Enterprise together for a new posting. Troi tells him she will have to think about it.

For their third attempt, Captain Picard selects Lt. Riker's plan over Cdr. Riker's, leaving Cdr. Riker further upset. The plan to get the data is successful, but on the way out a walkway collapses, putting Lt. Riker in mortal danger. Rescuing him would also put Cdr. Riker in peril, and Lt. Riker tells him not to risk it. But Cdr. Riker saves his double, and both return to the Enterprise.

The two Rikers reconcile their differences; Lt. Riker states that he has been given a new assignment on another ship, and plans to take on his middle name "Thomas" to distinguish himself from William. As a parting gift, Cdr. Riker gives his double his treasured trombone, noting that it belongs equally to him. Troi also tells Lt. Riker that she will be staying on the Enterprise, but thanks him for the time they had.

Reception 
The A.V. Club reviewed this episode in 2011, and gave it a B+; they felt that LeVar did a "fine job" directing and the same said for the acting.

Legacy 
Mae Jemison often gives talks and mentions her experiences with Star Trek to connect with audiences about careers in science and technology.

Releases 
The episode was released as part of the Star Trek: The Next Generation season six DVD box set in the United States on December 3, 2002.  A remastered HD version was released on Blu-ray optical disc, on June 24, 2014.

On November 3, 1998 this episode and "Rightful Heir" were released together on LaserDisc in the United States for 34.98 USD. The episodes were on a single 12" double-sided optical disc with a Dolby Surround soundtrack.

See also

"Defiant", a Star Trek: Deep Space Nine episode which marks Thomas Riker's return.

References

External links
 

Star Trek: The Next Generation (season 6) episodes
1993 American television episodes
Television episodes directed by LeVar Burton